The Hopfner HS-5/28 was a utility aircraft built in Austria in the late 1920s. It was a conventional, parasol-wing monoplane with seating for two occupants in tandem, open cockpits. The landing gear was of fixed, tailskid type with divided main units. Two examples were built with Walter NZ60 engines, followed by two more with the more powerful NZ85 for Swiss aeroclub use. One of these latter machines remained in service until 1934.

Variants
 HS-5/28 - version with NZ60 engine
 HS-5/28a - version with NZ85 engine

Specifications (HS-5/28)

References

Further reading

External links
 Уголок неба

1920s Austrian civil utility aircraft
Hopfner aircraft
Aircraft first flown in 1928
Single-engined tractor aircraft
Parasol-wing aircraft